The casting couch is a euphemism for the practice of soliciting sexual favors from a job applicant in exchange for employment in the entertainment industry, primarily acting roles. The practice is illegal in the United States. Predominantly male casting directors and film producers use the casting couch to extract sex from aspiring actors in Hollywood, Bollywood, Broadway, and other segments of the industry. The term casting couch originally referred to physical couches in the casting office, but is now a metonym for the phenomenon as a whole. Depictions of casting couch sexual encounters have also become a genre of pornography.

Legality 
The casting couch is illegal under United States and California law. In the United States, the majority of lawsuits related to the practice are settled, resulting in a lack of case law.

Etymology 
In The Atlantic, linguist Ben Zimmer described the casting couch as "a metonym for the skewed sexual politics of show business", which has been normalized into a cliché due to the prevalence of sexually aggressive men with positions of authority in Hollywood cinema and Broadway theatre.

Economics 
According to economists Thomas Borcherding and Darren Filson, the high risk and returns in Hollywood cinema encourage the casting couch phenomenon. The possibility of high returns incentivizes unestablished actors to accept minimal wages in exchange for roles. With the exception of a few extremely talented actors, producers are unable to evaluate the aptitude of the vast majority of qualified actors due to uncertainty. As a result, some actors give sexual favors to producers to obtain a perceived advantage in the casting; the casting couch functions as a counterpayment that effectively reduces their wages. This creates a conflict of interest in which corrupt producers substitute aptitude (an unquantifiable variable) with sexual activity in their decision-making.

Actors who submit to the casting couch are not guaranteed roles, as there is an abundance of actors who participate in the practice. An actor's decision of whether to provide sex is comparable to the prisoner's dilemma, and results in a tragedy of the commons in which sex is needed to obtain film roles from producers who demand it, but fails to provide an advantage relative to other actors who offer sexual favors. If the provision of sex were voluntary and performed with the consent of all parties, the casting couch would be a quid pro quo exchange and a victimless crime. However, the practice is illegal in the United States and likely involves some degree of sexual exploitation or sexual harassment. Actors who do not participate in the casting couch are subject to externalities, including reduced employability.

Borcherding and Filson argue that the casting couch became less prominent after the Hollywood studio system, which enforced long-term employment contracts for actors, was eliminated on antitrust grounds in United States v. Paramount Pictures, Inc. (1948). Long-term contracts gave producers stronger bargaining power, which was used by corrupt producers to extract sex from actors more effectively.

Pornography 

The Casting Couch ( 1924), a classic title in the stag film genre, was an early depiction of the casting couch as a pornographic trope that later became mundane as it grew in popularity. In the ten-minute film, a casting director tells a young actress to wear a swimsuit during an audition, spies on her in a voyeuristic manner while she undresses in a different room, and enters the room to solicit sex from her. The actress initially rebuffs his advances with disgust, but returns to the director after taking advice from a book titled How to Become a Movie Star. She performs fellatio and vaginal intercourse in exchange for a role in his film; the latter takes place on a couch. The Casting Couch concludes with an intertitle that states, "the only way to become a star is to get under a good director and work your way up". Zimmer credited the film with popularizing the term casting couch.

The trend of casting couch scenarios used on pornography websites began with Backroom Casting Couch in 2007.

GirlsDoPorn sex trafficking
From 2009 to 2020, the pornographic company GirlsDoPorn produced hundreds of videos of casting couch pornography mostly featuring women aged 18–22 who had not otherwise appeared in pornography. The depicted women were manipulated, coerced, lied to, given marijuana or other drugs or physically forced to have sex, according to the accounts of victims and material from a lawsuit against the company. Six people involved in the website were charged with sex trafficking by force, fraud and coercion in November 2019. Official videos from the company were viewed over a billion times, including a paid subscription service on its website, and an estimated 680 million views on the tube site Pornhub, where the official channel was among the site's top 20 most viewed. Pirated copies of the videos were also viewed hundreds of millions of times. According to a lawsuit, the videos could still be found on mainstream pornography websites up to at least December 2020. In 2020, twenty-two women were awarded a cumulative $12.75 million in damages as a result of a lawsuit which alleged that women who filmed for the website were lied to throughout the process.

See also 
 Sexual abuse in the American film industry
 Sexual capital
 Transactional sex

References

External links 

 "The Casting Couch and Sexual Harassment in Early Hollywood" from Taylorology
 "You Must Remember This", a podcast that covers the casting couch in Hollywood

Entertainment scandals
Euphemisms
Film and video terminology
Culture of Hollywood, Los Angeles
Human sexuality
Recruitment
Sex scandals
Sexual abuse cover-ups
Sexual ethics
Sexual harassment
Sexual misconduct
Sexual misconduct allegations